Tangua is a town and municipality in the Nariño Department, Colombia.

History

Economy

Population 

Tangua, Nariño in Spanish

Municipalities of Nariño Department